Samsung Galaxy J7 (2017) (also known as Galaxy J7 Pro) is an Android-based smartphone produced, released and marketed by Samsung Electronics. It was unveiled and released in June 2017 along with the Samsung Galaxy J3 (2017). It is the successor to the Samsung Galaxy J7 (2016).

Specifications

Hardware 
The J7 is powered by an Exynos 7870 SoC including a 1.6 GHz octa-core ARM Cortex-A53 CPU, a Mali-T830MP1 GPU and 3 GB of RAM. It ships with either 16, 32 or 64 GB of internal storage which is expandable up to 256 GB with microSD card. The phone also introduces the 2nd J series phone (after the J5 (2017) to have a fingerprint sensor and Samsung Pay.

It is fitted with a 5.5-inch Full HD Super AMOLED screen featuring always-on-functionality and a 3600mAh Li-ion battery.

Software 
The J7 originally shipped with Android 7.0 "Nougat" with Samsung's Experience user interface, and can be upgraded to 9 "Pie" with One UI. It supports VoLTE with dual SIM enabled 4G. It also supports Samsung Knox and Samsung Pay.

See also 
 Samsung Galaxy
 Samsung Galaxy J series

References

External links 

Galaxy Core
Galaxy Core
Samsung smartphones
Android (operating system) devices
Mobile phones introduced in 2017
Discontinued smartphones